Paul Hopper may refer to:

 Paul A. Hopper  (born 1956), Australian bioentrepreneur
 Paul J. Hopper, American linguist